Antun Kovacic (born 10 July 1981) is a former Australian footballer.

Club career
Melbourne Victory recruited Kovacic from Oakleigh Cannons as a short-term replacement for the injured Daniel Piorkowski towards the end of the 06/07 season, featuring in two games.  He also played for several years in the now defunct National Soccer League with the Melbourne Knights.

In June, 2008 Kovacic began trialling with the Newcastle Jets and impressed in two pre-season games, including one against the Central Coast Mariners. In early July Kovacic signed with the Newcastle Jets on a two-year deal to bolster their defence.

In March, 2009, Kovacic moved to Ulsan Hyundai Horang-i to take up the club's '3+1' ACL roster spot.

He returned to Australia for one season, helping Richmond Eagles to the Victorian Premier League Premiership and Grand Final in 2010. In 2011, he moved to Indian I-League side Churchill Brothers.

In February 2014, Kovačić returned to the Melbourne Knights. With the Knights, he won the Dockerty Cup, helping the club to their first piece of silverware in 18 years. At the end of the season, Kovacic retired from competitive football.

References

External links

profile at newcastlejets.com.au

1981 births
Living people
Australian people of Croatian descent
Soccer players from Melbourne
Australian expatriate soccer players
Expatriate footballers in South Korea
A-League Men players
National Soccer League (Australia) players
Melbourne Victory FC players
Melbourne Knights FC players
Newcastle Jets FC players
Australian expatriate sportspeople in South Korea
Ulsan Hyundai FC players
K League 1 players
I-League players
Churchill Brothers FC Goa players
Australian expatriate sportspeople in India
Expatriate footballers in India
Association football central defenders
Australian soccer players